Yaron Avitov   was born in 1957 in Haifa, Israel. He is a writer, poet, anthologist, documentary filmmaker, literary critic and cultural researcher. He lives now in Ecuador.

He has published novels, anthologies and collections of short stories in Hebrew, such as Observation, Note from my Mom and Homeless. His works edited in Spanish are The people of the book, Jerusalem in the Andes, One is Our God, Lights of Madrid, The Book of Peace and Birds do not sing in Auschwitz.
He is a regular guest at book fairs in Latin America and his documentaries on Sephardic converts have been presented at international film festivals such as the International Jewish Film Festival in Miami. His new documentary, America Ladina tells the story of the Sephardic converts in Latin America.
Among several literary awards he has received the Prime Minister of Literature Prize, the Jerusalem Fund Award, the Amos House of the Presidency Prize, the Social Sciences Award, the Misgav Jerusalem Prize granted by Hebrew University of Jerusalem, and the Hebrew Literature Ambassador in Latin America Award for his tireless work on the cultural rapprochement between Latin America and Israel.

References

Jewish poets
Israeli poets
1957 births
Living people
People from Haifa
Recipients of Prime Minister's Prize for Hebrew Literary Works